Jessica Carlson (born  1993) is an American actress from New York City, known for her role as Rebecca the monkey girl in the Universal's Cirque du Freak: The Vampire's Assistant.

Career
Besides Cirque du Freak, Carlson has been in "Wonder of the World" and Blue Dress, The Life Before Her Eyes, Goyta, the Law & Order episode "Angelgrove", and The Big C episode "Blue-Eyed Iris". She played Laurie in an equity production of Brighton Beach Memoirs at the Emelin theater in Larchmont. Carlson also played Liesel Meminger in a "movie trailer" for the novel The Book Thief at the Teen Book Video Awards.

For her role in Cirque du Freak, Carlson won Best Supporting Actress in a Feature Film at the 2010 Young Artist Awards.

She attended Wesleyan University and The New School.

Film and TV
Blue Dress
Goyta
The Life Before Her Eyes
Law & Order
Cirque du Freak: The Vampire's Assistant
The Big C
A Future to Hold
The Man in the Woods

References

External links
 
 Deadline: The Man in The Woods (November 27, 2017) 
 
  (Dean-Kelly.com)

American film actresses
1993 births
Living people
21st-century American actresses